Jacqueline Washington (born July 17, 1962) is an American former athletics competitor.

Washington, a sprinter, attended the University of Houston during the early 1980s, earning All-American honors three times. She won three gold medals with the U.S. 4×100 metres relay team at the World University Games and another gold at the 1983 Pan American Games, where she also claimed a silver in the individual 100 metres event. Running sixth in the Olympic trials, Washington was a reserve in the relay team for the 1984 Summer Olympics in Los Angeles.

References

External links

1962 births
Living people
American female sprinters
Houston Cougars women's track and field athletes
Universiade gold medalists for the United States
Universiade medalists in athletics (track and field)
Medalists at the 1981 Summer Universiade
Medalists at the 1983 Summer Universiade
Medalists at the 1987 Summer Universiade
Medalists at the 1983 Pan American Games
Pan American Games medalists in athletics (track and field)
Pan American Games gold medalists for the United States
Pan American Games silver medalists for the United States
Athletes (track and field) at the 1983 Pan American Games
20th-century American women
21st-century American women